Leuconopsis is a genus of minute air-breathing land snails, terrestrial pulmonate gastropod molluscs in the family Ellobiidae.

Species
Species within the genus Leucanopsis include:
 Leuconopsis inermis Hedley, 1901
 Leuconopsis manningi Martins, 1996
 Leuconopsis novimundi (Pilsbry & McGinty, 1949)
 Leuconopsis obsoleta (Hutton, 1873)
 Leuconopsis pacifica Oliver, 1915
 Leuconopsis pellucida (D. Cooper, 1841)
 † Leuconopsis putealis Laws, 1950 
 Leuconopsis rapanuiensis Rehder, 1980
Species brought into synonymy
 Leuconopsis pellucidus [sic]: synonym of Leuconopsis pellucida (D. Cooper, 1841)
 Leuconopsis tatei Gatliff, 1905: synonym of Leuconopsis pellucida (D. Cooper, 1841)
 Leuconopsis victoriae Gatliff, 1905: synonym of Leuconopsis pellucida (D. Cooper, 1841)

References

 Nomenclator Zoologicus info
 Powell A. W. B., New Zealand Mollusca, William Collins Publishers Ltd, Auckland, New Zealand 1979 
 Spencer H.G., Willan R.C., Marshall B.A. & Murray T.J. (2011) Checklist of the Recent Mollusca Recorded from the New Zealand Exclusive Economic Zone
 Bruce A. Marshall, Molluscan and brachiopod taxa introduced by F. W. Hutton in The New Zealand journal of science; Journal of the Royal Society of New Zealand, Volume 25, Issue 4, 1995

Ellobiidae
Gastropods of New Zealand